Valeri Vladimirovich Frolov (born 13 March 1970) is a former Russian football player.

Honours
Gornyak
Kazakhstan Premier League bronze: 1993

References

1970 births
Living people
Soviet footballers
FC FShM Torpedo Moscow players
FC Spartak Kostroma players
FC Lokomotiv Nizhny Novgorod players
Russian footballers
Russian Premier League players
Kazakhstan Premier League players
Russian expatriate footballers
Expatriate footballers in Kazakhstan
FC Aktobe players
FC Torpedo NN Nizhny Novgorod players
FC Khimik-Arsenal players
Association football midfielders
FC Khimik Dzerzhinsk players
FC Dynamo Moscow reserves players